Maggoty Run is a stream in the U.S. state of West Virginia.

Maggoty Run most likely was named for the abundance of gnats along its course.

See also
List of rivers of West Virginia

References

Rivers of Marshall County, West Virginia
Rivers of West Virginia